Beijerinckia mobilis is a nitrogen fixing bacteria from the genus of Beijerinckia.

References

External links
Type strain of Beijerinckia mobilis at BacDive -  the Bacterial Diversity Metadatabase

Beijerinckiaceae
Bacteria described in 1950
Martinus Beijerinck